Akeem Abioye (born 12 September 1998) is a Nigerian professional footballer who plays as a midfielder for I-League club Sudeva Delhi.

Club career 
Born in Nigeria, Abioye made his senior debut with I-league club Rajasthan United, in the 2021–22 season against RoundGlass Punjab FC and has secured appearances for the Indian side primarily playing as right midfielder.

Initially signed by the Indian side Rajasthan United, he had appearance for the senior squad and played for I-League 2nd Division side (erstwhile) in the I-League Qualifiers season whereby the Nigerian has played up to the standards and made the club enable to acquire the promotion in the I-League.

Career statistics

Club

References 

Living people
1998 births
Nigerian footballers
Association football forwards
Rajasthan United FC players